Giuseppe Grassi (born 15 March 1942) is a retired cyclist from Italy. He won the UCI Motor-paced World Championships in 1968 and the Grand Prix Cemab road race in 1966.

References

1942 births
Living people
Italian male cyclists
Sportspeople from the Province of Prato
Cyclists from Tuscany